Britannia is the Latin name for Britain, used as the female personification of Britain.

Britannia may also refer to:

Arts, entertainment and media

Fictional entities
 Britannia, an alias of character Sage in the Marvel Comics universe
 Britannia, a fictional location in Ultima video games
Britannia, a fictional region of the manga and anime The Seven Deadly Sins
The Holy Britannian Empire, a fictional political entity in the anime Code Geass

Games
 Britannia (board game), a strategy board game introduced in 1986

Literature
 Britannia (novel), a 2015 novel by Simon Scarrow
 Britannia, a chorographical survey of Great Britain and Ireland by William Camden, 1586
 Britannia, a series of novels by M. J. Trow and Richard Denham
 Britannia (journal), a journal of the Society for the Promotion of Roman Studies
 Britannia, a comic miniseries by Valiant Comics

Television
 [[List of Britannia documentaries|Britannia documentaries]], a BBC TV series 
 Britannia (TV series), a 2018 historical fantasy drama

 Businesses and organizations 
 Britannia Building Society, a British mutual building society 18562009
 Britannia Hotels, a British hotel group
 Britannia Industries, an Indian food-products corporation known for Britannia biscuits
 Britannia United Church, a United Church of Canada congregation in Ottawa, Canada

 Places 
Canada
 Britannia, Calgary, a residential neighbourhood
 Britannia, Newfoundland and Labrador, a settlement in Trinity Bay
 Britannia, Ontario (disambiguation), several places in Ontario
 Britannia, Ottawa, a group of neighbourhoods in Bay Ward
 Britannia Beach, an unincorporated community in British Columbia
 Britannia Range (Canada), a subrange of the North Shore Mountains
 Rural Municipality of Britannia No. 502, Saskatchewan
 Britannia Secondary School, Vancouver, British Columbia

France
 Brittany, a region in France sometimes called Britannia minor to distinguish it from Britain

United Kingdom
Britannia, the Roman Province of Britain
 Britannia, Lancashire, a suburb of Bacup, Lancashire
 Britannia railway station (18811917), a disused railway station
 Britannia, Richmond, London, a public house and Grade II listed building
 Britannia Fields, a public open space near Britannia Road, Burbage, Leicestershire
 Britannia Royal Naval College, Dartmouth, Devon
 Britannia Park, replaced by The American Adventure Theme Park, Derbyshire

Other countries
 Britannia Range (Antarctica), a mountain range
 Mount Britannia, a mountain on Rongé Island, Graham Land, Antarctica
 Britannia, Mauritius, a region in Savanne district, Mauritius
 Britannia railway station, Melbourne, a railway siding in Melbourne, Australia
 Britannia Village, a neighborhood of Taunton, Massachusetts, United States

 Sport 
 Britannia Posen, a German association football club active 
 FC Britannia XI, a Gibraltar futsal club
 INEOS Britannia, a British sailing team
 SV Britannia (Sport Vereniging Britannia), an association football club in Aruba
 Berliner Thor- und Fussball Club Britannia, a German football team, renamed Berliner SV 1892

 Transportation 
Aircraft and airlines
 Bristol Britannia, an airliner built by the Bristol Aeroplane Company from 1952
 Britannia Airways, a UK-based charter airline 19612005

Cars
 Britannia (cyclecar), a British 4-wheeled vehicle 191314 by Britannia Engineering Co. Ltd.
Bristol Britannia, a version of Bristol Type 603 198294

Ships
 Britannia (ship), the name of several ships
 , the name of several Royal Navy warships
 , the name of several steamships
 HMY Britannia (Royal Cutter Yacht), a British royal racing yacht 18931936
 HMY Britannia, a British royal yacht 195497
 Britannia-class steamship, the Cunard Line's initial fleet of wooden paddlers from 1840

Steam engines

 Britannia, a GWR 3031 Class locomotive 18911915
 Britannia Class, BR Standard Class 7 steam locomotives for British Railways from 1951
 BR Standard Class 7 70000 Britannia, the first Britannia Class steam locomotive
 Namaqualand 0-4-2T Britannia, a South African steam locomotive of 1905

 Other uses 
 Acleris britannia, or Brittania Moth, a species of moth 
 Britannia (coin), British bullion coins first issued in 1987
 Britannia metal, also called Britannia ware, a type of pewter alloy
 Britannia silver, an alloy of silver 
 "Britannia", one of the Geographic Beanie Babies dolls 
 Britannia (1675 atlas), an atlas of England and Wales, in linear form
 Britannia Depicta, an illustrated road atlas for Britain, printed in numerous editions from 1720 into the 19th century

See also
 
 
 Rule Britannia (disambiguation)
 Britain (disambiguation)
 Britannic (disambiguation)
 British (disambiguation)
 Brittain (disambiguation)
 Brittany (disambiguation)
 Encyclopædia Britannica''
 Britânia Sport Club, a former Brazilian football club